Midline nevus flammeus (also known as salmon patch and "angel's kiss") is a vascular birthmark which may be found on the glabellar region or on one upper eyelid, and presents in approximately 15% of newborns.

See also 
 List of cutaneous conditions
 Mongolian spot
 Nevus flammeus
 Nevus flammeus nuchae

References

 
Dermal and subcutaneous growths